Acer lucidum is an Asian species of maple. It has been found only in southern China (Fujian, Guangdong, Guangxi, Jiangxi, Sichuan).

Acer lucidum is a small tree up to 10 meters tall, with brown of grayish-brown bark. Leaves are non-compound, thick and leathery, up to 9 cm wide and 4 cm across, lance-shaped with no teeth or lobes.

References

External links
line drawing for Flora of China drawings 2 + 3 at top

lucidum
Plants described in 1932
Flora of China